is a song by Spanish singer Blas Cantó. It was released as a digital download and for streaming on 9 March 2018, as the third single from Cantó's debut studio album Complicado. The song was written by Antonio Rayo, Leroy Sanchez, Manuel Herrero Chalud and Rafael Vergara. The song peaked at number 35 on the Spanish Singles Chart and stayed on the list for forty weeks, achieving a platinum certification.

Music video
A music video to accompany the release of "Él no soy yo" was first released onto YouTube on 9 March 2018.

Track listing

Accolades

Charts

Certifications

Release history

References

2018 singles
2018 songs
Songs written by Rayito
Blas Cantó songs
Songs written by Leroy Sanchez